The Island is the second film from Bulgarian director Kamen Kalev. It is a Bulgarian-Swedish production telling the story of a young Parisian couple spending their vacation on a small island off the Bulgarian Black Sea coast. The film premiered 16 May 2011 at the Directors’ Fortnight in Cannes 2011.

Synopsis 
Sophie and Daneel, both in their early thirties, are a close and passionate couple living in Paris. Sophie initiates a surprise journey to Bulgaria. Daneel explicitly refuses to go, but Sophie insists and finally convinces him to leave. When they arrive, Sophie discovers that Daneel was born there.

After a few hours spent on the crowded beaches, Daneel leads Sophie to an almost abandoned island lost in the Black Sea. Once there, Daneel discovers pregnancy tests in Sophie’s luggage. The heat and the strange few inhabitants soon alter their own behaviors, and the island slowly reveals hidden fears that question their love. To get through it all, they have to jump into the unknown.

Cast 
 Thure Lindhardt — Daneel
 Laetitia Casta — Sophie
  — Lou
 Rousy Chanev — Pavel
  — Simon
 Luben Dilov Son — actor
 Alexander Elenkov — Bellboy
 Alejandro Jodorowsky — Jodo
 Elli Medeiros — Jeanette
 Mihail Mutafov — Ilia
 Valia — actress
 Boyka Velkova — Irina
 Ivan and Andrey — actor

Awards and nominations

References

External links 

2011 films
2010s Bulgarian-language films
2011 drama films
Films set on islands
Films shot in Bulgaria
Films directed by Kamen Kalev
Bulgarian drama films
Swedish drama films
2010s Swedish films